Pelagius of Lugo (985-1000) was a medieval Galician clergyman.

References
 Consello da Cultura Galega (ed.), Documentos da Catedral de Lugo, (Santiago de Compostela, 1998)

Year of birth uncertain
1000 deaths
10th-century Galician bishops